The 1952 Montana State Bobcats football team was an American football team that represented Montana State University in the Rocky Mountain Conference (RMC) during the 1952 college football season. In its first season under head coach Tony Storti, the team compiled a 2–5 record (1–4 against conference opponents) and finished fifth out of six teams in the RMC.

Schedule

References

Montana State
Montana State Bobcats football seasons
Montana State Bobcats football